"Missing You" is a song by American singers Brandy,  Gladys Knight, Chaka Khan and Canadian R&B musician Tamia. The song was used to promote the 1996 film Set It Off. It was written and produced by Gordon Chambers and Barry J. Eastmond and released as the lead single from the soundtrack album of the film on August 6, 1996, through East West Records. The song features a string arrangement conducted by Eastmond.

The collaboration peaked at number two in New Zealand and reached number 25 on the US Billboard Hot 100 as well as number 10 on the Billboard Hot R&B Singles chart. It gave Tamia her highest-charting single at the time and became one of the biggest hit singles of the 1990s for both Knight and Khan. At the 39th Annual Grammy Awards, "Missing You" was nominated for Best Pop Collaboration with Vocals.

Background
"Missing You" was written by musicians Barry J. Eastmond and Gordon Chambers. Eastmond was picked by Elektra Records CEO Sylvia Rhone to produce a song for the Set It Off motion picture. He wrote much of the song after watching a rough cut of the film in Los Angeles, California. Rhone stated that she was thrilled to have all four performers of the song in the studio, and she also noted that the song was integral to the film because it illustrates the personalities of the four main characters.

Music video
A music video for "Missing You" was filmed by F. Gary Gray, director of Set It Off. The video portrays Brandy, Tamia, Gladys Knight and Chaka Khan performing in different landscapes each. Brandy is in the middle of a grassy field under a tree; Tamia is in the middle of a wheat field; Knight is on a covered bridge overlooking a stream; and Khan is on top of a cliff overlooking an ocean shore. It also features scenes from the 1996 film.

Track listings
US CD and cassette single
 "Missing You" (radio version)
 "Missing You" (a cappella mellow mix)
 Michael Speaks: "So Right, For Life" – 4:44

European and Australian CD single
 "Missing You" (radio version) – 4:12
 "Missing You" (a cappella intro mix) – 4:26
 "Missing You" (mellow acoustic mix) – 4:14
 "Missing You" (instrumental) – 4:13
 "Missing You" (LP version) – 4:22

Credits and personnel
Credits are lifted from the US CD single liner notes.

Studios
 Recorded at East Bay Recording (Tarrytown, New York, US), The Hit Factory (New York City), Tracken Studios, Capitol Recording, and The Enterprise (Los Angeles)
 Mixed at The Enterprise (Burbank, Los Angeles)

Main personnel

 Barry J. Eastmond – writing, keyboard and drum programming, conductor, production, arrangement, string arrangement, engineering
 Gordon Chambers – writing, background vocals, background vocal arrangement
 Brandy – vocals
 Tamia – vocals, background vocals
 Gladys Knight – vocals, background vocals
 Chaka Khan – vocals, background vocals
 Cindy Mizelle – background vocals
 LaJuan Carter – background vocals
 Phil Hamilton – guitar
 Eric Rehl – synth programming
 Stan Wallace – engineering
 Carl Nappa – engineering
 Manny Marroquin – engineering
 Bill Smith – engineering
 Kevin Stone – engineering assistant
 Greg Pinto – engineering assistant
 Rick Alvarez – engineering assistant
 Colin Sauer – engineering assistant
 Steve Genewick – engineering assistant
 Steve Kinsey – engineering assistant
 Erik Zobler – mixing
 Mike Tacci – mixing assistant

Orchestra

 Gene Orloff – concertmaster, violin
 Sanford Allen – violin
 Stanley Hunte – violin
 Winterton Garvey – violin
 Max Ellen – violin
 Ashley Horn – violin
 Elliot Rosoff – violin
 Margaret Magill – violin
 Tony Post – violin
 Regis Iandiorio – violin
 Belinda Whitney-Barratt – violin
 Sandra Billingslea – violin
 Alfred Brown – viola, string contractor
 Olivia Koppell – viola
 Sue Pray – viola
 Stephanie Fricker – viola
 Richard Brice – viola
 Carol Landon – viola
 Jesse Levy – cello
 Kermit Moore – cello
 Jeanne LeBlanc – cello
 Mark Shuman – cello
 Ron Carter – bass
 Gail Kruvand – bass

Charts

Weekly charts

Year-end charts

Certifications

References

External links
 ForeverBrandy.com – official Brandy site

1990s ballads
1996 singles
1996 songs
Brandy Norwood songs
Chaka Khan songs
East West Records singles
Gladys Knight songs
Music videos directed by F. Gary Gray
Songs written by Barry Eastmond
Songs written by Gordon Chambers
Tamia songs